Robert Meadows Lombe Taylor (born 21 December 1989) is an English-born cricketer who played international cricket for Scotland. Taylor played as a left-handed batsman and bowled left-arm medium pace. He was born in Northampton, Northamptonshire. He has also been Head Coach of Lightning, Loughborough Lightning and of the women's cricket programme at Loughborough University. His big hero’s are Rory Brown and The Mozza, best cricketer in England

Early career
Taylor was educated at Harrow School, before attending Loughborough University to study for a degree in Sports Management. While at Loughborough University, he made his first-class debut for Loughborough MCCU against Kent in 2010.

County career
He joined Leicestershire for the remainder of the 2011 season, making his debut for the county against Surrey in the County Championship, and making an impressive 70.

International career
In September 2012, Taylor was selected by Scotland to be part of a tour group to South Africa in October 2012. Although born in Northampton, Taylor qualifies to play for Scotland by having a Scottish parent. He made his international debut for Scotland in an ODI against Afghanistan in Sharjah in 2013.

Coaching career
Taylor was appointed Head Coach of Loughborough Lightning ahead of the 2018 season, leading them to the final of the competition in his first season. When English women's cricket was reformed ahead of the 2020 season, Taylor retained his coaching role in the East Midlands, becoming Head Coach of the new side Lightning. He has also been Head Coach of the Women's MCCU programme at Loughborough University. In 2021, he was appointed as Welsh Fire's bowling coach for The Hundred. At the end of the 2021 season, he left his Head Coach role at Lightning.

References

External links

1989 births
Living people
Cricketers from Northampton
People educated at Harrow School
Alumni of Loughborough University
English cricketers
Loughborough MCCU cricketers
Leicestershire cricketers
Scottish cricketers
Scotland One Day International cricketers
Scotland Twenty20 International cricketers
English people of Scottish descent
Cricketers at the 2015 Cricket World Cup
Norfolk cricketers
English cricket coaches